La Liberté may refer to:

 La Liberté (Canada), Canadian newspaper
 La Liberté (1865 newspaper), a French newspaper created by Charles-François-Xavier Müller in 1865 and later sold to Émile de Girardin
 La Liberté (1871 newspaper), a Swiss newspaper created by Mamert Soussens in 1871